Events from the year 1679 in the Kingdom of Scotland.

Incumbents

 Monarch – Charles II

Judiciary 
 Lord President of the Court of Session – James Dalrymple
 Lord Justice General – Sir George Mackenzie
 Lord Justice Clerk – Sir Thomas Wallace of Craigie, Lord Craigie

Events 
 3 May – James Sharp, the Church of Scotland Archbishop of St Andrews, is assassinated at Magus Muir in Fife when his coach is ambushed by a group of nine Covenanters; only two of the assassins, David Hackston and Andrew Guillan, are captured.
 1 June – Battle of Drumclog: A group of 200 Covenanters overwhelm a small Scottish Army unit that has been pursuing them for the murder of Archbishop Sharp. The Covenanters, led by 19-year-old William Cleland, kill 36 of the Scottish soldiers.
 22 June – Battle of Bothwell Bridge: Royal forces led by the Duke of Monmouth (the King's illegitimate son) and John Graham of Claverhouse subdue the Covenanters. Cleland goes into exile.
 10 December – More than 200 captives on the ship The Crown of London, all Scottish Covenanters arrested after the battle of Bothwell Bridge, are killed when the ship is wrecked on the Orkney Islands while transporting the group to exile in North America.

Births
 James Erskine, Lord Grange, judge (died 1754)

Deaths
 22 June – William Gordon of Earlston, landowner and Covenanter, shot at Battle of Bothwell Bridge (born 1614)
 27 November – Archibald Primrose, Lord Carrington, judge (born 1616)

See also

Timeline of Scottish history
 1679 in England

References

 
Years of the 17th century in Scotland